Uranium-235 (235U or U-235) is an isotope of uranium making up about 0.72% of natural uranium. Unlike the predominant isotope uranium-238, it is fissile, i.e., it can sustain a nuclear chain reaction. It is the only fissile isotope that exists in nature as a primordial nuclide.

Uranium-235 has a half-life of 703.8 million years.  It was discovered in 1935  by Arthur Jeffrey Dempster. Its fission cross section for slow thermal neutrons is about 584.3±1 barns. For fast neutrons it is on the order of 1 barn.
Most neutron absorptions induce fission, though a minority result in the formation of uranium-236.

Natural decay chain

Fission properties 

The fission of one atom of uranium-235 releases  inside the reactor. That corresponds to 19.54 TJ/mol, or 83.14 TJ/kg. Another 8.8 MeV escapes the reactor as anti-neutrinos. When  nuclides are bombarded with neutrons, one of the many fission reactions that it can undergo is the following (shown in the adjacent image):

Heavy water reactors and some graphite moderated reactors can use natural uranium, but light water reactors must use low enriched uranium because of the higher neutron absorption of light water. Uranium enrichment removes some of the uranium-238 and increases the proportion of uranium-235. Highly enriched uranium (HEU), which contains an even greater proportion of uranium-235, is sometimes used in the reactors of nuclear submarines, research reactors and nuclear weapons.

If at least one neutron from uranium-235 fission strikes another nucleus and causes it to fission, then the chain reaction will continue. If the reaction continues to sustain itself, it is said to be critical, and the mass of 235U required to produce the critical condition is said to be a critical mass. A critical chain reaction can be achieved at low concentrations of 235U if the neutrons from fission are moderated to lower their speed, since the probability for fission with slow neutrons is greater. A fission chain reaction produces intermediate mass fragments which are highly radioactive and produce further energy by their radioactive decay. Some of them produce neutrons, called delayed neutrons, which contribute to the fission chain reaction. The power output of nuclear reactors is adjusted by the location of control rods containing elements that strongly absorb neutrons, e.g., boron, cadmium, or hafnium, in the reactor core. In nuclear bombs, the reaction is uncontrolled and the large amount of energy released creates a nuclear explosion.

Nuclear weapons 
The Little Boy gun-type atomic bomb dropped on Hiroshima on August 6, 1945, was made of highly enriched uranium with a large tamper. The material must be 85% or more of 235U and is known as weapons grade uranium, though for a crude and inefficient weapon 20% enrichment is sufficient (called weapon(s)-usable). Even lower enrichment can be used, but this results in the required critical mass rapidly increasing. Use of a large tamper, implosion geometries, trigger tubes, polonium triggers, tritium enhancement, and neutron reflectors can enable a more compact, economical weapon using one-fourth or less of the nominal critical mass, though this would likely only be possible in a country that already had extensive experience in engineering nuclear weapons. Most modern nuclear weapon designs use plutonium-239 as the fissile component of the primary stage; however, HEU (highly enriched uranium, in this case uranium that is 20% or more 235U) is frequently used in the secondary stage as an ignitor for the fusion fuel.

Uses 
Uranium-235 has many uses such as fuel for nuclear power plants and in nuclear weapons such as nuclear bombs. Some artificial satellites, such as the SNAP-10A and the RORSATs were powered by nuclear reactors fueled with uranium-235.

References

External links 
 Table of Nuclides.
 DOE Fundamentals handbook: Nuclear Physics and Reactor theory Vol. 1 , Vol. 2 .
 Uranium | Radiation Protection Program | US EPA
 NLM Hazardous Substances Databank – Uranium, Radioactive
 "The Miracle of U-235", Popular Mechanics, January 1941—one of the earliest articles on U-235 for the general public

Actinides
Fissile materials
Isotopes of uranium
Special nuclear materials
Radionuclides used in radiometric dating